Albert or Al Vandeweghe may refer to:

 Al Vandeweghe (born 1920), former professional American football player
 Al Vande Weghe (1916–2002),  American competition swimmer and Olympic silver medalist at the 1936 Summer Olympic Games